Last Night is a Romanian band formed in 2015 that was active until 2017. The band consisted of 3 members: Felix Popescu, Cristi Marce, and Bogdan Pauna.

History 
Felix Popescu is believed to have brought together Last Night.

The band first appeared in April 2015 at Roton Music label in Romania, with their first single, LIAR. The song was received well and ranked on the music charts as well as YouTube.

In 2016, the band released Next To You with Fly Project, Wanna Love You in collaboration with Anda Adam, and Hai, Hui.

Members

Discography

Last Night

References

External links
Last Night Facebook official Page
Felix Noa Facebook official Page

2015 establishments in Romania
2017 disestablishments in Romania
Musical groups established in 2015
Musical groups disestablished in 2017
Romanian boy bands